Rose Tree Media School District is a school district headquartered in Media, Pennsylvania, United States. Rose Tree Media School District is serviced by the Delaware County Intermediate Unit. It has approximately 3,700 students in its six schools.  The superintendent is Eleanor DiMarino-Linnen.

The district includes the following municipalities: Media, Edgmont Township, Middletown Township, and Upper Providence Township.

Schools

 Penncrest High School 
 Springton Lake Middle School
 Glenwood Elementary School
 Indian Lane Elementary School
 Media Elementary School
 Rose Tree Elementary School

Board of School Directors
Current Board Members:
 Susan Henderson-Utis - President
 Theresa Napson-Williams - Vice President
 Hillary Fletcher
 Jackie Gusic
 Shelly Hunt
 Rob Kelly
 Susan Layne
 Kelly Schaffer
 Kristin Seale

References

External links
 
 PA Department of Education

Middletown Township, Delaware County, Pennsylvania
School districts in Delaware County, Pennsylvania
1955 establishments in Pennsylvania
School districts established in 1955